Airline was a store brand of consumer electronics and musical instruments originally marketed and sold by American retailer Montgomery Ward via their catalog and retail stores. Products included radios, televisions, record players, guitars and amplifiers. In the early 2000s, Eastwood Guitars acquired the rights to use the "Airline" brand-name.

Musical equipment 

The Airline brand was used by Montgomery Ward on a range of electric and acoustic guitars from 1958-68. These were made in Chicago, Illinois, by the Valco Manufacturing Co., Kay Musical Instrument Company, and Harmony Company. Airline-branded amplifiers were manufactured by Valco and Danelectro.

Valco Airline guitars have been played by a wide array of bands and artists, including: Jack White, J. B. Hutto, David Bowie, The Cure, PJ Harvey, Calexico, and Wooden Shjips.

Eastwood Guitars reissue 
After Eastwood Guitars purchased rights to the "Airline" trade name in the early 2000s, they reissued the early 1960s "JB Hutto" Airline shape as the "Airline DLX." The new version set aside the defining hollow fiberglass body of the Valco-made original in favor of the simpler and less-costly chambered mahogany body, giving it a more traditional electric guitar feel and tone, rather than the unique playing feel and response of the original.

Eastwood Guitars later released the "Airline '59 Custom" in two- and three-pickup models in December 2008, which come with striped pickguards and rubber-bound bodies, in the spirit of the originals.

See also
 Valco
 National String Instrument Corporation — origin of Valco, via National Dobro Corporation
 Supro
 Kay Musical Instrument Company
 Harmony Company
 Eastwood Guitars

References

External links

  — home of reissued Airline guitars.
  — home of Res-O-Glas guitar kits.

Acoustic guitars
Electric guitars
Instrument amplifiers